Henrik Gulden (born 29 December 1995) is a Norwegian footballer who plays as a midfielder for Mjøndalen. He is the oldest son of former professional footballer and current Puma SE CEO Bjørn Gulden.

With Rot-Weiss Essen Gulden won the Lower Rhine Cup in 2016. In summer 2016 he was transferred back to his youth club Sportfreunde Niederwenigern in the town of Hattingen.

Career

Statistics

References

External links

1995 births
Living people
Norwegian footballers
Association football midfielders
Sportspeople from Drammen
VfL Bochum II players
VfL Bochum players
Mjøndalen IF players
Rot-Weiss Essen players
Norway youth international footballers
Norwegian expatriate footballers
2. Bundesliga players
Eliteserien players
Norwegian expatriate sportspeople in Germany